Kipling is a town in southeast Saskatchewan, Canada. In provincial politics, Kipling is in the constituency of Moosomin. The town was named after the English author Rudyard Kipling.

History
Kipling sites which can be classed as 'heritage properties' include the former CN station, built in 1908–09, and the Kingsley rural municipality office, built in 1919. In addition, a major and highly interesting group of pioneer-era buildings can be viewed on the spacious sites belonging to the Kipling and District Historical Society Museum. The Kipling and District Museum (1903–59) is a Municipal Heritage Property on the Canadian Register of Historic Places.

In 2007, Canadian blogger Kyle MacDonald successfully parlayed one red paperclip via a series of trades into a house in Kipling.  The town commemorates the story with the Guinness World Record certified World's Largest Paper Clip, 15 feet tall and weighing 3043 pounds.

Demographics 

Government
There is a town council.

 Kipling is within the provincial constituency of Moosomin, and is represented in the Legislative Assembly of Saskatchewan by Steven Bonk of the Saskatchewan Party.

Federally, Kipling is in the riding of Souris-Moose Mountain, and is represented in the 42nd Parliament by Robert Kitchen, of the Conservative Party of Canada.

Climate

Sports
The Kipling/Windthorst Oil Kings of the senior men's Big 6 Hockey League play in the local arena.

The Kipling Royals of the Saskota Baseball League play at the ball diamonds in Kipling.

See also
List of towns in Saskatchewan
List of communities in Saskatchewan

References

Other sources
 The Unforgiving Minute – A Life of Rudyard Kipling Harry Ricketts, Pimlico, 2000   
 What was he doing out?- The Province, Page A8, Vancouver BC Brett Popplewell, Canadian Press, August 3, 2006

External links

Towns in Saskatchewan
Kingsley No. 124, Saskatchewan
Division No. 5, Saskatchewan